Roman Stefurak (born 17 April 1996 in Tomakivka, Dnipropetrovsk Oblast, Ukraine) is a Ukrainian football midfielder.

Career
Demchenko is a product of FC Metalurh Zaporizhzhia youth team system.

He made his debut for Metalurh Zaporizhzhia in the Ukrainian Premier League in a match against FC Shakhtar Donetsk on 28 August 2015.

In January 2016 he signed a contract with another Ukrainian Premier League side FC Chornomorets Odesa.

References

External links
 
 

1996 births
Living people
Ukrainian footballers
FC Metalurh Zaporizhzhia players
Ukrainian Premier League players
People from Dnipropetrovsk Oblast
FC Chornomorets Odesa players
FC Kramatorsk players
SC Tavriya Simferopol players
Association football midfielders
Sportspeople from Dnipropetrovsk Oblast